Ismael Debjani (born 25 September 1990) is a Belgian middle-distance runner who competes primarily in the 1500 metres. He represented his country at the 2017 World Championships without advancing from the first round.

He is the current Belgian national record holder in the indoor 1500 metres.

International competitions

Personal bests

Outdoor
800 metres – 1:46.31 (Oordegem 2021)
1000 metres – 2:18.44 (Brussels 2020)
1500 metres – 3:33.06 (Geneva 2021)
One mile – 3:52.70 (Oslo 2021)
3000 metres – 8:00.17 (Herentals 2017)
5000 metres – 13:32.45 (Heusden-Zolder 2022)

Indoor
1000 metres – 2:19.02 (Ghent 2020)
1500 metres – 3:36.38 (Ostrava 2022) NR
3000 metres – 7:53.16 (Louvain-La-Neuve 2022)

References

External links

  
 
 
 

1990 births
Living people
Belgian male middle-distance runners
World Athletics Championships athletes for Belgium
Olympic athletes of Belgium
Athletes (track and field) at the 2020 Summer Olympics
Sportspeople from Charleroi